USS Vincennes may refer to:

 , was an 18-gun sloop-of-war commissioned in 1826 and sold in 1867
 , was a  commissioned in 1937 and lost in the Battle of Savo Island in 1942
  was a  commissioned in 1944 and decommissioned in 1946
  was a  commissioned in 1985 and decommissioned in 2005 primarily known for the shooting down of Iran Air Flight 655 in 1988 which killed all 290 on board.

United States Navy ship names